Daniel Ato Kwamina Mensah also popularly known as D. K. Mensah (24 October 1953 – 17 July 2020) was a Ghanaian banker, research economist and former educator. He served as the chief executive officer of the Ghana Association of Bankers for 27 years since 1993. He died on 17 July 2020 at the age of 66 due to short illness. Prior to his death in 2020, he was supposed to retire from the position of CEO of the GBT later in the year.

Career 
Daniel completed his BA Hons degree in Economics and Political Science from the University of Ghana; MsC degree in International Trade from the University of Ibadan and MBA degree from the Ghana Institute of Management and Public Administration. He was also a fellow of Chartered Institute of Bankers, Institute of Loan and Risk Management and a member of Chartered Institute of Marketing.

He initially pursued his career as an educator teaching in primary, secondary and tertiary sectors before venturing into banking career in 1985. He was employed as a research economist by the National Investment Bank in 1985. During his stint as a research economist with the National Investment Bank, he conducted sectoral studies for investment planning in private and public sector financing. In July 1993, he was officially appointed as the CEO of the Ghana Bankers'  Association. He also served as the president of West African Bankers' Association from 1995 to 1997.

References 

1953 births
2020 deaths
Ghanaian economists
Ghanaian bankers
Ghanaian educators
University of Ghana alumni
University of Ibadan alumni
Ghana Institute of Management and Public Administration alumni